Edo Lullaby ( or Edo komoriuta) is a traditional Japanese cradle song. It originated in Edo, was propagated to other areas, and is said to be the roots of the Japanese lullabies.

Lyrics

Japanese
ねんねんころりよ　おころりよ。
ぼうやはよい子だ　ねんねんしな。

ぼうやのお守りは　どこへ行った。
あの山こえて　里へ行った。

里のみやげに　何もろうた。
でんでん太鼓に　笙の笛。

Romanized Japanese
Nen, nen korori yo, Okorori yo.
Bōya wa yoi koda, Nenneshina~

Bōya no omori wa, Doko e itta?
Ano yama koete, sato e itta.

Sato no miyagē ni, nani morōta?
Denden taiko ni, shō no fue.

English translation
Hush-a-bye, Hush-a-bye!
My good baby, Sleep!

Where did my boy's babysitter go?
Beyond that mountain, back to her home.

As a souvenir from her home, what did you get?
A toy drum and a shō flute.

See also
 Lullaby
 Folk song
 Other Japanese lullabies: Itsuki Lullaby, Takeda Lullaby, Chūgoku Region Lullaby, etc.

References

External links
 Edo no komoriuta (A Hundred Lullabies in Japanese, in Japan Society of Lullabies' home page)
  (Played on the guitar) 
 

Lullabies
Edo
Japanese folk songs
Song articles with missing songwriters
Year of song unknown